Potter–Williams House is a historic home located at Huntington in Suffolk County, New York. It is a -story, four-bay, gable-roofed clapboard structure resting on a 1-story raised stone foundation. It features a massive central chimney and three pane frieze windows. It was built in 1827 and representative of the late settlement period of Huntington.  Also on the property is a springhouse.

It was added to the National Register of Historic Places in 1985.

References

External links
Google Map location

Houses on the National Register of Historic Places in New York (state)
Houses completed in 1827
Houses in Suffolk County, New York
National Register of Historic Places in Suffolk County, New York
1827 establishments in New York (state)